Two-Mile Borris (also written Twomileborris or Two Mile Borris;  and locally Borris or TMB) is a village in County Tipperary, Ireland. It is also situated 1 mile from junction 5 of the M8 motorway. Its population was 572 as of the 2016 census, up from 502 in 2006. It is situated in the townland of Borris which is part of the civil parish of Twomileborris in the ancient barony of Eliogarty.Placenames database of Ireland  - Twomileborris civil parish

History
In the 1830s, the village was the property of Hugh Nugent O'Reilly.

History of the placename
The name Borris is generally believed to have come from the Norman word for a borough, district or stronghold. The Irish name Buiríos Léith was historically anglicised as Borrisleigh or Borris Leigh. The use of Leigh in the placename would seem to be related to the monastic settlement of Liathmore-Mochoemóg in Leigh, about a mile and a half to the north-east of the village. Those who prefer the Irish name of Buirgheas Dhá Mhíle say that the name refers to King Mile, ancestor of Niall of the Nine Hostages and numerous Irish Kings and heroes.

Amenities and facilities

It has a primary school, Catholic church, two pubs and two shops. There are a number of housing estates.  The village is located right at the edge of the Golden Vale and the Bog of Allen and so the quality of the land varies around the area, with most of the best farming land located to the west of the village. Parts of the land to the east are too boggy to be used, even for extracting turf. The village proper is bounded on the west by the Black River, a tributary of River Drish, which goes on to join River Suir. The approach to the village is dominated by a Norman tower-house.

In June 2011 planning permission was given by An Bord Pleanála for a casino, hotel with 500 rooms and a racetrack, known as the Tipperary Venue. An Taisce opposed the project, telling a planning tribunal that it had concerns about the impact on local water and other ecological factors as well as the commercial impact on Limerick and Tipperary. In September 2011 then Minister for Justice Alan Shatter said that the casino project had been "ruled out" based on a cabinet decision.

Notable people 

 Martin Hayes (born 1959), Roman Catholic prelate and current Bishop of Kilmore, grew up in Borris

See also
 List of towns and villages in the Republic of Ireland
 List of civil parishes of Tipperary

References

Towns and villages in County Tipperary
 Two